Daniel Campbell (1671/72 – 1753), or Donald Campbell, of Shawfield and Islay, was a leading Glasgow merchant, slave trader and Member of Parliament, nicknamed "Great Daniel" because of his size and great wealth.

Dates
Campbell was the eldest son of Walter Campbell of Skipnish, and was born about 1671. In many books of reference he is stated to have been born in 1696 and to have died in 1777, the former date being that of his son John 
Campbell's birth, and the latter that of his grandson Daniel Campbell's death.

Merchant
At the age of 22 he set up business in New England, before settling in Glasgow, where he traded tobacco for iron ore. He also engaged in the slave trade and in finance. He was very successful as a merchant, and in 1707 purchased the estate of Shawfield or Schawfield, in Rutherglen, from Sir James Hamilton. He also came to possess the valuable estate of Woodhall, near Holytown.

Member of Parliament
A follower of the Duke of Argyll, he represented Inverary in the Scottish parliament from 1702 till the union, and was one of the commissioners who signed the treaty. He also sat in the first Parliament of Great Britain, 1707–8, and represented the Glasgow burghs from 1716 to 1734. In 1711 he built, for his town residence in Glasgow, Shawfield mansion, which became famous in connection with the Shawfield riots in 1725.

The Shawfield Riots and the purchase of Islay

Campbell had voted for the imposition of the malt tax in Scotland, and on this account the mob, after taking possession of the city and preventing the officers of excise from collecting it, proceeded to the Shawfield mansion and completely demolished the interior. The provost and magistrates were arrested on the ground of having favoured the mob, and Campbell received £9,000 from the city as compensation for the damages caused by the riot. Soon afterwards he purchased the island of Islay, the sum obtained from the city forming a large part of the money paid for it.

Family
Campbell died on 8 June 1753, aged 82. By his first marriage to Margaret Leckie (the daughter of John Leckie of Newlands) he had three sons and three daughters, and by his second to Catherine Denham one daughter. On his death, having been pre-deceased by his eldest son, he was succeeded by his grandson, Daniel Campbell of Shawfield and Islay (c 1737–1777). Another grandson was Walter Campbell of Shawfield.

Campbell died on 8 June 1753, aged 82. "By his first marriage to Margaret Leckie (the daughter of John Leckie of Newlands) he had three sons and three daughters.  His sons all died before him.  After Margaret's death in 1711 he married Katherine Erskine in 1714, herself a widow, and had another daughter." "Daniel the Younger inherited the Islay estates from his grandfather in 1753, when he was just 16 years old and legally a minor. Daniel was laird until his death in 1777."  "The Round Church, Bowmore 1767/68 was built as part of Daniel Campbell's new village at Bowmore."  "When Daniel the Younger died aged forty, in 1777 his brother Walter inherited the island and continued the process of integration with the mainland and their improvements, begun by great Daniel.  The family as a whole worked indefatigably for improvements in education, religion, agriculture, industry and administration."

Biography
Campbell's biography A very canny Scot was written by Joanna Hill and Nicholas Bastin, and published in 2007.

Notes

References

1670s births
1753 deaths
Members of the Parliament of Great Britain for Scottish constituencies
18th-century Scottish businesspeople
Members of the Parliament of Scotland 1702–1707
British MPs 1707–1708
British MPs 1715–1722
British MPs 1722–1727
British MPs 1727–1734
People from Islay
Rutherglen
Burgh Commissioners to the Parliament of Scotland
Politics of Argyll and Bute
Scottish unionists
Politicians from Glasgow
Scottish slave traders